The University of Stavanger (Norwegian: Universitetet i Stavanger, UiS) is a university located in Stavanger, Norway. UiS was established in 2005 when the former Stavanger University College (Høgskolen i Stavanger; HiS) received university status. It had about 11,000 students and 1,370 employees including academics, administrative and service staff in 2017.

History and focus
The university has its roots in Rogaland Regional College, established in 1969. In 1986 Rogaland Regional College merged with the Rogaland Polytechnic to form Rogaland College Center. Stavanger University College was formed in 1994 when Rogaland College Center merged with Stavanger Nursing College, Stavanger Social Work College, the Norwegian Hospitality College, Stavanger Teachers' College, Rogaland Music Conservatory and the Congregational College. Stavanger University College was granted the status of a university by the government in 2005.

It is organised in six faculties: Educational Sciences and Humanities, Social Sciences, Science and Technology, Performing Arts, Health Sciences and the Norwegian School of Management at UiS. There are also two national centres of expertise and the Museum of Archaeology. The university campus is located in the neighborhood of Ullandhaug.

The University of Stavanger is currently the third highest ranked in Norway in terms of number of research publications per member of scientific staff. The university became a member of the European Consortium of Innovative Universities (ECIU) in October 2012.

The university offers doctorates in: Literacy; Risk Management and Societal Safety; Educational Sciences; Health and Medicine; Management, Economics and Tourism; Sociology, Social Work and Culture & Society; Chemistry and Biological Science; Offshore Technology; Petroleum Technology; Risk Management and Societal Safety- Technical/Scientific Approach; and Information Technology, Mathematics, and Physics.

Faculties and departments

Faculty of Arts and Education
Department of Education and Sports Science
Department of Early Childhood Education
 Filiorum Center: High Quality in Early Childhood Education and Care 
Department of Cultural Studies and Languages

Faculty of Social Sciences
Department of Media and Social Sciences
Department of Social Studies
The Norwegian School of Hotel Management

Faculty of Science and Technology
Department of Electrical Engineering and Computer Science
 Stavanger AI lab 
Department of Mathematics and Physics
 Quark-Lab: Centre for fundamental physics research (SFF)
Department of Mechanical and Structural Engineering and Materials Science
Department of Safety, Economics and Planning
Department of Chemistry, Biosciences and Environmental engineering
Department of Energy Resources
Department of Energy and Petroleum Engineering

Faculty of Health Sciences
 Department of Public Health
 Department of Quality and Health Technology
 Department of Caring and Ethics

Faculty of Performing Arts
 Department of Classical Music
 Department of Jazz, Dance, PPU (Educational Theory and Practice), and Music Production

UiS Business School
The UiS Business School (In Norwegian: Handelshøyskolen ved UiS) is a business school and a faculty under UiS. The school offers a wide variety of educational programmes, and is one of the largest institutions in Norway educating students at the masters level in business administration.

Notable people

Faculty

Ellen Nisbeth, violist
Kjersti Engan, scientist
Jan Egeland, diplomat, political scientist and humanitarian leader
, gender and media researcher
Hande Eslen-Ziya, sociologist

Alumni

Hadia Tajik, politician
Geir Bergkastet, director
Helge Eide, oil & gas executive
Ingrid Fiskaa, politician
Leif Johan Sevland, politician
Bodil Arnesen, opera singer

References

External links 

 Official website

 
University of Stavanger
Universities and colleges in Norway
Education in Rogaland
Business schools in Norway
University of Stavanger
Educational institutions established in 2005
Organisations based in Stavanger
2005 establishments in Norway